This is a list of radio stations in Hawke's Bay in New Zealand.

FM and AM Stations in Hastings and Napier

LPFM Stations

Stations in Wairoa and Central Hawke's Bay

References

Hawke's Bay
Hawke's Bay Region